Francis Garden  (1810–1884) was a Scottish theologian and religious author. When in England  he generally served in the Anglican church, but in Scotland he served in the Episcopalian church.

Early life 
He was born on 10 December 1810, the son of Alexander Garden (b.1786), a Glasgow merchant, and Rebecca, daughter of Robert Menteith, esq., of Carstairs. They stayed at 110 Argyll Street. After home-tutoring he attended Glasgow University from whence he passed to Trinity College, Cambridge, where he took his degree of B.A. in 1833 and M.A. in 1836. In 1833 he obtained the Hulsean prize for an essay on the ‘Advantages accruing from Christianity.’

At Cambridge he belonged to the set of which Richard Chenevix Trench, F. D. Maurice, and John Sterling were among the leaders, whose intimate friendship, together with that of Edmund Lushington and George Stovin Venables, he enjoyed. His name occurs frequently in Trench's early letters (Memorials, i. 118, 182, 186, 236, &c.), and he was Trench's companion in Rome and its environs in January 1835.

Career 
He was ordained priest in 1836 and originally served briefly in London , before gaining a post as Curate to Sir Herbert Oakeley at Bocking in Essex. In 1838–9 he was curate to Julius Charles Hare at Hurstmonceaux in Sussex, succeeding after an interval his friend Sterling. There was hardly sufficient sympathy between Garden and Hare for him to stay long as his curate, and he removed in 1839 to the curacy of St James's Church, Piccadilly, from which he became successively the incumbent of Holy Trinity Church, Blackheath Hill (1840–4).

In 1844, following the Disruption of 1843 in the Scottish church and a new religious climate, he returned to Scotland. Here he served at St Paul’s Episcopal Chapel, on Carrubber's Close (demolished 1880). Despite being small the chapel held 550 persons. His final role (1859 until death) was as Sub-Dean of the Chapel Royal at Holyrood Palace (succeeding Dr Wesley) directly serving Queen Victoria. In this role he would be given lodgings in or close to the palace.

In 1848 he was elected a Fellow of the Royal Society of Edinburgh his proposer being Charles Terrot.

He died on 10 May 1884. He is thought to be buried in the burial ground of Holyrood Abbey next to the palace.

Publications

In 1841 he undertook the editorship of the Christian Remembrancer, which he retained for some years.

In his earlier years Garden attached himself to the Oxford school, which was then exercising a powerful attraction over thoughtful minds. Trench describes a sermon he heard him preach in 1839 on ‘the anger of God,’ as ‘Newmanite and in parts very unpleasant.’ He subsequently became somewhat of a broad churchman, adopting the teaching of F. D. Maurice on the incarnation, the atonement, and other chief Christian doctrines, and contributing several thoughtful essays to the series of ‘Tracts for Priests and People,’ a literary organ of that school. The bent of his mind was essentially philosophical, disinclined to rest in any bare dogmatic statements without probing them to the bottom to discover the intellectual basis on which they rested.

In 1844 he published ‘Discourses on Heavenly Knowledge and Heavenly Love,’ followed in 1853 by ‘Lectures on the Beatitudes.’ A pamphlet on the renunciation of holy orders, then beginning to be debated, appeared in 1870 under the title ‘Can an Ordained Man become a Layman?’

‘An Outline of Logic’ was issued in 1867, which came to a second edition in 1871. He was also the author of ‘A Dictionary of English Philosophical Terms,’ 1878; ‘The Nature and Benefits of Holy Baptism;’ ‘The Atonement as a Fact and as a Theory.’ He was a contributor to Smith's Dictionary of the Bible the Christian Remembrancer, The Contemporary Review and other periodicals.

Family
In 1837 he married Virginia Dobbie, daughter of Captain Dobbie RN (later Admiral Dobbie) in Great Saling, Essex. He later married "Miss Boucher" probably the daughter of Deacon A. P. Boucher of Cambridge.

References

External links
 

1810 births
1884 deaths
Clergy from Glasgow
Alumni of Trinity College, Cambridge
Scottish Episcopal theologians
Fellows of the Royal Society of Edinburgh
Scottish non-fiction writers